Gener may refer to:

People:

Tania Gener (born 1988), Spanish artistic gymnast
Juan Guitéras y Gener (1852–1925), Cuban physician and pathologist
Gener (Thomist writer), a Thomist writer of the 18th century
Gene Ween

Other:
Tropical Storm Gener (disambiguation)
AES Gener, former name of AES Andes, a Chilean electricity producer and distributor

See also
Gene (disambiguation)